Paroreio (pronounced Parori by locals) (before 1926 - Bitusha (Bituša/Bitusha) is a small village located about 15 kilometres north of Florina, the capital of the regional unit of Florina in northwestern Greece. It is on the ridge of Baba Mountain on the periphery of the Pelagonia plain. Today, Paroreio is inhabited by only a small number of full-time residents.  At its peak in the 1930s, the village reached about 600-700 inhabitants, mostly families looking for a piece of fertile land to cultivate and farm in the nearby valley. The residents were employed in agriculture, raising livestock, timber getting and other trades and necessary occupations.

History
Little of history was known between the Medieval and the Balkan Wars but during that time it was called Bitusha (Битуша, Bitousa in Greek).  It was annexed to Greece in 1913 and many inhabitants moved northeast, some to Eastern Thrace and Asia Minor. In 1926 the Greek government renamed the village to Paroreio in an effort to Hellenize Macedonia.

The region saw a military presence during World War I and World War II, with French and other ally troops establishing small bases in the area.  Border towns like Parorio were at risk of invading parties from the Balkans to the North, who were looking for any point of entry into Greece and access to its important sea routes.  The area also saw a brutal conflict when the Greek Civil War emerged following World War II.  Many were forced out of their homes and much hardship and tragedy took place at this time.

Following the Civil War, the region saw a mass exodus of people migrating to North America, Australia, and even parts of Africa, where opportunity and a better way of life existed.

Today, the area is sparsely inhabited, but is experiencing a slight rejuvenation in the agriculture industry, as part of a plan funded by the European Union.  Some of Greece's most fertile land lies in the area that surrounds the region.

Demographics

See also

Paroria (disambiguation)
List of settlements in the Florina regional unit

References

Populated places in Florina (regional unit)